The Type 99 81 mm mortar (Japanese as "Kyukyu Shiki Shohakuyekiho", meaning "99 model small trench mortar") was a Japanese mortar used primary by Imperial Japanese Army during World War II. The Type 99 designation was given to this mortar as it was accepted in the year 2599 of the Japanese calendar (1939).  The Type 99 81 mm mortar is typical of the Stokes-Brandt type mortar. The Type 99 81 mm mortar differs from the Type 97 81 mm infantry mortar in the shortness of its tube and in the method of firing. The differences between the Type 99 and the US 81-mm mortar, M1 are pronounced.

Design
The Type 99 is a smooth bore, muzzle-loading weapon of the Stokes-Brandt type. The Type 99 81 mm mortar differs from the Type 97 81 mm infantry mortar in the shortness of its tube, which is only 21.75 inches as compared with 45.34 inches of the Type 97. The mortar can be disassembled into three units: the tube, the bipod, and the base plate. The legs of the bipod, made of tubular steel, are mounted on the elevating screw housing by a clevis joint. They terminate in thin steel plates which have single-pointed spikes on the underside. The spread of the legs is limited by a chain which has a spring attached to one end to relieve the shock of firing. A buffer system incorporated in the bipod gives a recuperation of 2 inches. The recoil cylinders are filled with light grease or heavy oil. The base plate, made of pressed steel, has a series of ribs and braces welded on the underside to allow it to dig into the ground when the piece is fired. On the top side of the plate, in the center, is a circular depression into which the base-cap knob fits when the mortar is mounted in firing position. A carrying handle is attached to the rear edge of the plate. Also, two small hooks are welded to the rear edge to permit the attachment of a carrying strap. Around the outer edge of the plate is a one-inch ridge, and on the lower front edge a hook is attached through which a small rod can be thrust and used for slight changes in base plate alignment. A stability test of the Type 99 mortar, in which a total of 14 rounds were fired, produced no visible evidence of cracking or deformation of either base plate or bipod. The plate sank about 2 inches into the ground with the firing of seven rounds at alternate elevations of 45 to 75 degrees. Stability was very satisfactory when firing zone charges I to IV, but zones V to VI produced noticeable hop of the mortar and a sinking of the base plate. The reported range of the weapon of about 2,200 yards has not been conclusively confirmed.

The differences between the Type 99 and the US 81-mm mortar, M1 are more pronounced. The tube length of the Japanese weapon is only about half that of the US mortar 59.5 inches vs 25.5 inches. Of much greater significance, however, is the difference in the method of firing. Whereas the Type 97 has a fixed firing pin in the base cap, the Type 99 has its firing pin affixed to a camshaft that extends outside the base cap of the mortar. This shaft must be struck a sharp blow with a mallet to drive it inward so as to force the firing pin against the primer of the propellant cartridge. The primer ignites the propellant charge of the cartridge, which in turn ignites the powder increments attached to the fins. The weapon fires with an exceptionally loud report and a pronounced muzzle flash. When the firing pin camshaft is struck, the camshaft spring is extended. When it snaps back into its original shape, it withdraws the camshaft thus bringing the firing pin down into the base cap in position for the next shot. In addition to the different methods of firing, the Japanese weapon also employs a turnbuckle for cross-leveling instead of an adjusting nut and connecting rod, and its recoil mechanism also differs from that of the US piece. Finally, the Japanese base plate has only one socket for the base cap knob, and it is not provided with a sighting line.

When in firing position, the mortar tube is attached to the bipod by a clamp. It then is fastened to the base plate by the insertion of the spherical knob on the base cap into the socket on the plate and rotating the mortar 90 degrees right or left. The tube is smooth bored, and its interior surface is carefully finished. Tolerance between the wall of the tube and the bourrelet of the shell is very close, thus preventing the shell from striking the firing pin with sufficient percussion to detonate the primer. On its outside surface the tube has a sighting line and quadrant seat at the muzzle end. The base cap of the tube is hollowed and threaded to screw onto the breech end of the tube which it thereby seals against gas leakage. The cap terminates in a spherical knob, which locks into the socket of the base plate and is bored and is threaded axially to receive the firing pin and the base cap plug.

Firing system
This mortar has a unique firing system.  Most mortars of less than 200 mm bore size use a fixed firing pin at the bottom of the tube, and as the shell is dropped into the tube, the shell slides down to the bottom, where the firing pin strikes the primer in the base of the shell, igniting the propellant. The US M1 mortar uses this system. Larger mortars such as the breech loading M1919 12-inch Coastal defense mortar are manually fired once the shell is in the mortar, using a lanyard pull to strike the firing pin igniting the propellant or electrically with a primer that ignites the propellant when the firing switch is closed.  The Type 99 mortar is fired by manually striking a trigger with a hammer or other heavy object.

When in place, the firing pin is held retracted into the base cap by the camshaft spring, being compressed between the camshaft and the camshaft lock. When the change lever is turned to "safe", the firing pin is locked "down", the firing pin cam is locked "out", and the mortar will not fire. When the change lever is turned to "fire", the pin is in the "down" position, but the cam now has free movement. If the camshaft now is struck with a block or mallet, the firing pin is forced to the "up" position firing the round. The change lever cannot be turned from "safe" to "fire" when the firing pin camshaft is pressed in. If the change lever is turned from "fire" to "safe", with the firing pin camshaft pressed in, the firing pin is locked in the "up" position, and the round will be fired automatically when it is dropped down the tube.

Specifications
Specifications of the Type 99 81 mm mortar are as follows:

Ammunition
Two types of ammunition, smoke or chemical, and high-explosive are known. Likewise, there are two weights of shells-7.2 pounds and 14.3 pounds. The complete 7.2-pound round consists of a percussion fuze, the shell body, the fin assembly, the primer cartridge, and the propelling charge. The propelling charge is made up of increments, each increment consisting of a lacquered silk envelope containing a ballistite-type propellant. The primer cartridge, enclosed at one end by a lacquered brass head, resembles a 12-gauge shotgun shell. The body of the high-explosive shell is painted black, inside and out, and contains an explosive charge of about 1 pound of TNT. A white band is painted around the base of the body of the shell, a yellow band at the junction of the shell and the fin assembly, and a red band around the nose, on the fuze adapter. The 7.2-pound shell is 11.6 inches long unfuzed.

The fuze of the 81 mm shell functions on impact with instantaneous or delayed action. A hollow brass plug, that can be inserted in the fuze, provides delayed action of probably 0.1 second. For transport, the fuze is carried separately from the rest of the shell in a soldered tinplate canister with a screw-lid. The fuze is held within the canister by two wooden blocks shaped to take the base and the nose of the fuze. Two holes are drilled in the upper surface of the top block, and in one of these the delay plug rests.

There is also a green signal flare fired from the Type 99 81-mm mortar, as well as a parachute smoke signal.
The 81mm mortar was also used to launch an unusual AA Mine Discharger shell.

The following results were achieved in a firing test that employed both Japanese ammunition and U. S. M43A.

The Japanese generally were poorly prepared for the proper packaging of ammunition at the start of the war. Ammunition of all kinds was packed in wooden boxes with fillers to hold it in position, and only the most rudimentary protection against moisture was provided by tarring joints and knot holes and occasionally wrapping rounds in wax paper for additional waterproofing. In view of the faulty packaging, it was common for 50 per cent to 90 per cent of hand grenades and mortar shells to fail to function. Now, however, the Japanese are utilizing metal and asphalt-impregnated paper linings for their ammunition containers, and consequently deterioration has been materially lessened.

References

Notes

Bibliography
 US War Department No 1820 Description of Twelve Inch Mortars and instructions for their care 1917
 US War Department Special Series No. 19 Japanese Infantry Weapons December 1943
 US War Department Special Series No 30 Japanese Mortars and Grenade Dischargers 1945
 US War Department TM-E 30-480 Handbook on Japanese Military Forces 1 October 1944

External links
 War Department TM-E 30-480 Handbook on Japanese Military Forces at hyperwar.org
 A Type 100 81mm mortar round at inert-ord.net

9
World War II infantry weapons of Japan
Infantry mortars of Japan
Military equipment introduced in the 1930s